Bishop Dubois High School was a private Catholic high school in New York City from 1946 until 1976.

History

Bishop Dubois High School of New York City opened its doors in September 1946 with the first graduating class in 1950.

The main building and Annex of the private, Roman Catholic Bishop Dubois high school was located in the Hamilton Heights area of Manhattan at 503 and 505 West 152nd St. New York City, N.Y. 10031.

The Catholic school was established using the name, Bishop John Dubois, after John DuBois (August 24, 1764 – December 20, 1842).

The school provided education to male students and prepared them for college and provided the basis for the development of spiritual, academic, and personal qualities to promote themselves and their family, community, and society.

Principals

 Rev. MSGR. Michael A. Buckley, Founding Principal, 1946–1960
 Rev. MSGR. William J. Ward, Principal, 1960–1969
 Rev. MSGR. William J. McMahon, Principal, 1969–1976

Yearbook

There was no yearbook produced for the class of 1976 due to the foreseen closure of the school and therefore the last yearbook was published in 1975.

Award and crest

Faculty
The faculty, teachers, and staff of the school consisted of Marist Brothers, Fathers or Roman Catholic Priests, Sisters or Nuns, lay teachers, administrative and general staff.

Notable faculty and staff

 Peter Garvey, English and Religion Teacher, Guidance Councilor
 Joe Walling, Basketball, Baseball coach and Gym Teacher
 John Lamb, Track coach and Business Teacher
 John Byrne, English Teacher
 Thomas Clancy, Business Teacher
 Charles Conroy, History Teacher, Advisor
 Bruce Bernero, Science and Mathematics Teacher
 Rev. Hugh A. Dardis, History Teacher and Dean of Discipline
 Rev. Edward P. Hauck, Bursar
 Sr. Carole Walsh, Mathematics Teacher

Father Donald T. Driscoll, a priest for forty-two years, provided guidance counseling to the students of BDHS while the school operated but his contribution after the school closed helped the alumni to organize three school reunions in 2000, 2001, and 2002.  The reunions took place at Our Lady Queen of Peace in Orangeburg, New York, where Father Driscoll was a Chaplain.

In 1986, the Cardinal asked me to become Chaplain at Rockland Psychiatric Center (Our Lady Queen of Peace) where we had two reunions.   The portrait and commemorating plaque is in the vestibule of the Chapel, and I received a standing ovation from about 500 parishioners.   I will miss them. Father Driscoll

Alumni
The school was located in the upper Manhattan area and the composition of students that attended the school were from the five boroughs of New York.

Notable alumni
 Jack Keane, class of 60, retired four-star General, former Vice Chief of Staff and Chief Operating Officer of the Army from 1999 until 2003, also served on the Board of Directors of MetLife.
 George Carlin, a well-known comedian, attended the school.
 Kenny Rankin picture is in the 1955 year book, p. 42.; he would have graduated in 1957 but he moved back to Canada.
 Adriano Espaillat, U.S. Representative of New York's 13th District.

Closure
The last graduating class of Bishop Dubois High School was the class of 1976.
List of closed schools in the Roman Catholic Archdiocese of New York

Activities
Students participated in an activity sponsored by the school. Activities are open to all qualified and interested students. These activities include:
 School Plays
 School Dances
 The Yearly Senior Boat Ride
 The School Prom
 The Yearbook Committee
 The Senior Retreat

Senior students marching in the (Saint Patrick's Day) Parade carrying the school flag.

Sports

Students participated in the sports offered by the school.  Sports were open to all students that qualified academically.
Sports that alumni participated include:
 Basketball, Varsity and JV
 Track
 Baseball
 Bowling

References

External links 
 Peter Bournias, alumnus of the class of 1973
 The Original Catholic Encyclopedia
 Msgr. J. J. Kowsky, 66, Police Dept. Chaplain
 Bishop Dubois High School listing at classmates.com
 A video of the school reunion in 2001, 25 years after the school closed.
 Kenny Rankin attended BDHS in 1955
 Terence G. McTigue, a former supervisor in the Police Department’s bomb squad
 James V. DeBlase, class of 1974 died in the terrorist attack of September 11, 2001
 Walter "Wally" Travers, class of 1975 died in the terrorist attack of September 11, 2001

Private high schools in Manhattan
Defunct Catholic secondary schools in New York City
Educational institutions established in 1946
Educational institutions disestablished in 1976
1946 establishments in New York City
1976 disestablishments in New York (state)
Schools in Harlem